The mangrove vireo (Vireo pallens) is a species of bird in the family Vireonidae.

Description
A drab olive or olive-grey bird, the mangrove vireo has yellow lores and two white wing bars. Sexes are similar. There are two disjunct populations of this vireo: Caribbean and Pacific. The Caribbean population has both yellow and grey colour phases, while the Pacific population has no colour phases.

Subspecies
There are 10 known subspecies:
 V. p. angulensis (Parkes, 1990): The Bay Islands of Honduras. 
 V. p. browningi (A. R. Phillips, 1991): Southeastern Nicaragua.
 V. p. nicoyensis (Parkes, 1990): Peninsula and Gulf of Nicoya, Costa Rica. 
 V. p. ochraceus (Salvin, 1863): Pacific mangroves from Oaxaca to El Salvador (Sometimes lumped with V. p. paluster). 
 V. p. olsoni (A. R. Phillips, 1991): Parts of Belize.
 V. p. pallens (Salvin, 1863): Honduras and Nicaragua. 
 V. p. paluster (R. T. Moore, 1938): Pacific mangroves from Sonora to Nayarit (Sometimes lumped with V. p. ochraceus).
 V. p. salvini (Van Rossem, 1934): Yucatan Peninsula, Mexico and adjacent islands. 
 V. p. semiflavus (Salvin, 1863): Southernmost Campeche, southernmost Quintana Roo, Belize, Guatemala, and Honduras. 
 V. p. wetmorei (A. R. Phillips, 1991): Easternmost Guatemala.

Range and habitat
It is found in Belize, Costa Rica, El Salvador, Guatemala, Honduras, Mexico, and Nicaragua.
Its natural habitats are subtropical or tropical dry forests, subtropical or tropical mangrove forests, and subtropical or tropical dry shrubland. The Pacific population is restricted, as the name suggests, to mangroves, while the Caribbean population occupies a wider range of habitats.

Status
The IUCN has classified this species as being of Least Concern.

References

External links

 
 
 
 
 
 

mangrove vireo
Birds of Central America
Birds of Belize
Birds of the Yucatán Peninsula
Birds of the Caribbean
mangrove vireo
mangrove vireo
Taxonomy articles created by Polbot